Jorge García (born 2 May 1956) is a Spanish former alpine skier who competed in the 1976 Winter Olympics and in the 1980 Winter Olympics.

References

1956 births
Living people
Spanish male alpine skiers
Olympic alpine skiers of Spain
Alpine skiers at the 1976 Winter Olympics
Alpine skiers at the 1980 Winter Olympics
20th-century Spanish people